The name Barry has been used for seven tropical cyclones in the Atlantic Ocean and for one in the Australian Region.

In the Atlantic:
Hurricane Barry (1983), made landfall on Florida as a tropical storm, weakened to a depression before crossing, strengthened into a hurricane after exiting into the Gulf of Mexico; later struck Mexico, causing some damage
Tropical Storm Barry (1989), dissipated in the mid-Atlantic without threatening land
Tropical Storm Barry (1995), formed off South Carolina then moved north, making landfall on eastern tip of Nova Scotia, causing no damage
Tropical Storm Barry (2001), made landfall in Florida, causing two deaths and $30 million in damage
Tropical Storm Barry (2007), short-lived tropical storm that made landfall in western Florida
Tropical Storm Barry (2013), made landfall in Belize as a tropical depression before emerging into the Bay of Campeche and then making landfall in eastern Mexico
Hurricane Barry (2019), formed off the U.S. Gulf Coast before making landfall in Louisiana as a Category 1 hurricane

In the Australian region:
 Cyclone Barry (1996), Category 4 severe tropical cyclone (Australian scale)

Atlantic hurricane set index articles
Australian region cyclone set index articles